Ayadaw is a town and seat of Ayadaw Township in the Sagaing Division in Myanmar.

Township capitals of Myanmar
Populated places in Sagaing Region